Patrick Dacre Trevor-Roper (7 June 1916 – 22 April 2004) was a British eye surgeon, author and pioneer gay rights activist, who played a leading role in the campaign to decriminalise homosexuality in the UK.

Life and career
He was born in Northumberland, the son of a doctor, and the brother of historian Hugh Trevor-Roper. He was educated at Charterhouse, the University of Cambridge and the Westminster Medical School. During World War II he served in the Royal New Zealand Army Medical Corps in the Mediterranean. After the war he became a specialist in ophthalmic surgery, and divided his working life between work in public hospitals and a lucrative private practice in London.

In 1955 Trevor-Roper agreed to appear as a witness before the Wolfenden Committee which had been appointed by the British government to investigate, among other things, whether male homosexuality should remain a crime. He was one of only three men who could be found to appear as openly gay witnesses before the Committee. The others were the journalist Peter Wildeblood, who had been convicted of a homosexual offence, and Carl Winter, director of the Fitzwilliam Museum.

Trevor-Roper told the Wolfenden Committee that the majority of gay men led normal and well-adjusted lives, posed no threat to children or public morality, and that homosexuality was not a physical or mental illness. He pointed out that the existing laws did nothing but encourage blackmailers. He argued that the age of consent should be lowered to 16, and told the committee that many young gay men committed or attempted suicide because of isolation or depression induced by homophobia.

These were highly controversial views in the 1950s. Trevor-Roper's testimony helped persuade the Committee to recommend that male homosexuality should be decriminalised, which was finally done, after a long political struggle, in 1967.

Trevor-Roper remained an active gay rights activist, campaigning in particular for the abolition of the discriminatory age of consent laws. The 1967 law set the age of consent for male homosexuals at 21, while the heterosexual age of consent was 16. When the AIDS epidemic appeared in the early 1980s, Trevor-Roper was one of the founders of the Terrence Higgins Trust, the United Kingdom's leading AIDS service organisation, which held its first meeting at his home.

The other cause to which Trevor-Roper devoted himself was better access to ophthalmic medicine, both in the United Kingdom and in African countries. He campaigned successfully for the repeal of British laws which prevented the sale of cheap spectacles, against the resistance of the opticians' lobby. In 1983, he helped finance Peter Risdon in his successful challenge to the opticians' monopoly in the UK, a challenge that led directly to the legalisation of the sale of reading glasses without prescription. He founded the Haile Selassie Eye Hospital in Addis Ababa, Ethiopia and assisted in the founding of similar hospitals in Nigeria and Sierra Leone.

In 1945, Trevor-Roper's friends Edward Sackville-West, artist and art dealer Eardley Knollys and the music critic Desmond Shawe-Taylor jointly bought Long Crichel House, a Georgian rectory in Long Crichel, Dorset. Trevor-Roper lived there for a time and along with his friends established "one of the last great post-war salons, hosting guests including Sybil Colefax, Anthony Asquith, Graham Sutherland, Lord Berners, Nancy Mitford, Benjamin Britten, Laurie Lee, Ben Nicolson, Cecil Day-Lewis and Graham Greene."

Trevor-Roper was a lover of architecture and active in heritage conservation causes in the United Kingdom at a time when this was not a fashionable cause. He was a founding Trustee of the Spitalfields Historic Buildings Trust and his house was used as the office for the Thirties Society, later the Twentieth Century Society which he helped to found.

In his 1970 book The World Through Blunted Sight, he explored how faulty or failing eyesight affected the style and technique of writers and artists. Looking at the effects of myopia, cataracts, colour blindness, squints and total blindness he speculated on what the impact would have been on artists had they worn glasses.

Legacy 

The Patrick Trevor Roper Award is an award for undergraduate medical students from the UK and the Republic of Ireland in Ophthalmology.

Works 
 Trevor-Roper, Patrick (1970) The World Through Blunted Sight: An inquiry into the influence of defective vision on art and character. London: Thames & Hudson 
 Trevor-Roper, Patrick (1980) Lecture Notes in Ophthalmology. London: Blackwell Science

Further reading
Higgins, Patrick (1996) Heterosexual Dictatorship: Male Homosexuality in Postwar Britain. London: Fourth Estate

References 

1916 births
2004 deaths
People educated at Charterhouse School
British surgeons
Gay men
English LGBT people
British LGBT rights activists
British ophthalmologists
New Zealand military personnel of World War II
20th-century surgeons
20th-century LGBT people
New Zealand Army personnel
Military personnel from Northumberland